College NET, Inc. is an American developer of web technology for higher education and non-profit institutions based in Portland, Oregon.

History

Founded as Universal Algorithms, Inc., the company introduced the first automated classroom scheduling program for higher education. The company continued to expand the scheduling program to include event scheduling and resource management, and calendar publishing. The company also introduced web-based graphical analysis tools for campus space planning. In 1995, the company began offering Software as a Service (SaaS) to institutions with the Apply Web® system, which includes online admission application processing and evaluation for colleges and universities, as well as recruiting and communication management tools.

The company changed its name to College NET in May 1999. In recent years, College NET has expanded its products to include online course evaluation and all-purpose surveys; asynchronous video interviewing, international academic recruitment, and career services for students.

Products and Services

Admissions 
 Prospect – Recruitment and communication management system
 Admit – Admissions application evaluation management system
 Apply Web – Application processing system

Scheduling and Space Management 
 25Live® – Web-based event scheduling and publishing
 Schedule25® – Automated bulk course scheduling
 X25® – Graphical reporting and master planning

Career Services 
 Stand Out® – Video recruitment network for employers, students, and campus career centers

Course Evaluation and Surveys 
 What Do You Think? ®– Online course evaluations and surveys

International Student Services 
 US Academy® – Online resource for gaining a better understanding of US culture
 Video Interview – Web technology for international college admissions 
 CertiFile® – Academic document authentication and delivery services

Clients
Colleges, universities, and non-profits around the world including Stanford University, Princeton University, University of Michigan, Elon University, University of Nebraska–Lincoln, University of Oregon, University of Washington and Oregon State University now use the web-based administrative services provided and hosted by College NET.

Support for Education

College NET is a major financial contributor to college students. The company operates the Mach 25 scholarship search engine and has distributed over $2.25 million through the CollegeNET.com scholarship election site. CollegeNET.com is the first social network in the higher education arena that awards weekly and quarterly scholarships to students based on interactive participation and peer-voting.

Social mobility index
College Net produces the Social Mobility Index (SMI) which measures the degree that individual colleges and universities contribute to social mobility.

See also
 List of companies based in Oregon

References

Software companies established in 1977
Companies based in Portland, Oregon
1977 establishments in Oregon